Charyshsky is a rural locality (a settlement) in Krasnoshchyokovsky Selsoviet, Krasnoshchyokovsky District, Altai Krai, Russia. The population was 121 as of 2013.

Geography 
Charyshsky is located 12 km northwest of Krasnoshchyokovo (the district's administrative centre) by road. Podzaymishche is the nearest rural locality.

References 

Rural localities in Krasnoshchyokovsky District